was a Japanese sprinter. While still a student at Waseda University, he competed in the men's 100 metres at the 1988 Summer Olympics, He worked as a coach at Waseda after graduation. He died of pancreatic cancer on 6 April 2016.

References

1969 births
2016 deaths
Athletes (track and field) at the 1988 Summer Olympics
Japanese male sprinters
Olympic athletes of Japan
Place of birth missing
Waseda University alumni
Deaths from pancreatic cancer